The 2017 Delaware Fightin' Blue Hens football team represented the University of Delaware as a member of the Colonial Athletic Association (CAA) during the 2017 NCAA Division I FCS football season. Led by first-year head coach Danny Rocco, the Fightin' Blue Hens compiled an overall record of 7–4 with a mark of 5–3 in conference play, tying for fourth place in the CAA. The team played home games at Delaware Stadium in Newark, Delaware.

Previous season

The Hens started the season with two consecutive wins, against Delaware State and at Lafayette. They followed with a five-game losing streak, the longest by Delaware since 1939, which cost head coach Dave Brock his job. He was replaced by Dennis Dottin-Carter on an interim basis, and the Hens finished with a record of 4–7 (2–6 CAA).

Schedule

Coaching staff

Game summaries

Delaware State

at Virginia Tech

Cornell

James Madison

at Stony Brook

William & Mary

Richmond

at Towson

at Maine

Albany

at Villanova

Ranking movements

References

Delaware
Delaware Fightin' Blue Hens football seasons
Delaware Fightin' Blue Hens football